Felixkirk is a village and civil parish in the Hambleton District of North Yorkshire, England.  The village is situated about three miles north-east of Thirsk. The population of the civil parish was estimated at 100 in 2014.

History

The village is named after its church, itself dedicated to St Felix, a Burgundian who travelled with St Paulinus converting Saxons in England to Christianity during the seventh century. It may have not been known by its current name at the time of the Norman invasion as it does not appear in this form in the Domesday Book of 1086. 
Instead it is referenced as Fridebi with the manor lands shared between Gamal, son of Kalri and Ligulf, subsequently passing after invasion to Hugh, son of Baldric, who made Gerard of Boltby lord of the manor.

There are competing etymologies for Fridebi. It is the same as the old place name of nearby Firby sometimes taken to mean Peaceful Place from fred, a Danish word for peace. Alternatively, like other hamlets with Danish derived names it might mean Freda's dwelling where the personal name Freda also means Peace.

Nearby hill, Mount St John, was the location of a preceptory of the Order of St John of Jerusalem built in the 11th century. After the Dissolution of the Monasteries, the preceptory buildings were handed to the Archbishop of York. In 1720, the buildings were pulled down and a new manor house built. Still known as Mount St John, it is a grade II* listed building.

Governance
The village is within the Thirsk and Malton UK Parliament constituency. It lies within the Bagby & Thorntons ward of Hambleton District Council and Thirsk electoral division of North Yorkshire County Council.

The parish shares a grouped parish council, known as Hillside Parish Council, with the civil parishes of Boltby, Cowesby, Kirby Knowle and Upsall.

Geography
The nearest settlements are Thirlby  to the east; Sutton-under-Whitestonecliffe  to the south-east; Upsall  to the north; Boltby  to the north-east and Thirsk  to the south-west.

According to the 1881 UK Census, the population was 113. The 2001 UK Census recorded the population as 104, of which 85 were over the age of sixteen. Of those, 56 were in employment. The village contains 45 dwellings of which 24 are detached properties.

A bowl barrow at Howe Hill in the parish is a scheduled ancient monument. There are two Grade II* listed buildings (St Felix church and Mount St John) in the village and five Grade II listed structures.

Education

Primary education is provided at nearby Thirsk Community, South Kilvington CE Primary and Knayton CE Primary Schools. These schools are within the catchment area of Thirsk School for secondary education.

Religion

The village church is dedicated to St Felix and was substantially rebuilt in 1860 by William Hey Dykes, who is responsible for the unusual rounded apse. It is a grade II* listed building.

References

Villages in North Yorkshire
Civil parishes in North Yorkshire